The Chronicle, formerly the Daily Chronicle, is a local newspaper in Centralia, Washington, US. The newspaper is owned by CT Publishing and publishes three editions per week.

History

The Weekly Chronicle was founded in July 1889 by Thomas Scammons and J. E. Whinnery. It switched to daily publication the following year, renaming itself The Daily Chronicle. The Chronicle was purchased by the Lafromboise family in 1968 and was under the ownership of Jeraldine Lafromboise for several decades. In 2011, The Chronicle switched to publishing three editions per week due to declines in revenue, instead publishing digital editions on the remaining days. Lafromboise Communications sold The Chronicle to the Taylor family, owner of The Silver Agency in Chehalis, in 2021.

References

Centralia, Washington
Newspapers published in Washington (state)